The Church of St James is a Church of England parish church at Kinnersley in the English county of Herefordshire. It is a Grade I listed building.

History
The Church of St James dates from the 12th, 13th and 14th centuries. It was restored in 1868 by Thomas Nicholson. From 1873, interior decoration was designed by George Frederick Bodley and carried out by the Reverend Frederick Andrews. In the previous year, Bodley had married Minna Reavely; the Reavely family were the owners of Kinnersley Castle, immediately adjacent to the church. Bodley was buried in the churchyard at St James', following his death in 1907. The church remains an active parish church in the Diocese of Hereford. The building suffered deterioration in the 21st century; the roof has now been repaired but the ingress of water caused damp which has damaged the interior decoration. The church is currently on the Heritage at Risk Register.

Architecture and description
The design of the church is unusual. Its "most impressive" element is the, almost detached, tower, constructed in the 14th century. The body of the church is simple, a chancel dating from c.1300, with a north aisle and an arcade. The interior has waggon roofs, with "rich" decoration designed by Bodley and executed by Andrews. It includes much multi-coloured stenciling. Alan Brooks, in the 2012 revised Herefordshire volume of the Buildings of England series, describes the decoration as "particularly fine". St James is a Grade I listed building. The church contains some notable monuments, including one of the mid-17th century to Francis Smalman and his wife Susan, which Pevsner attributes to Samuel Baldwin.

The war memorial in the churchyard is designed in the form of an obelisk and commemorates the men of the village who died in both the First and the Second World Wars. It is a Grade II listed structure. Bodley's grave, which is also listed at Grade II, is close to that of his collaborator on the interior decoration of the church, the Rev. Frederick Andrews.

Gallery

External links
 Church of England Heirtage Record for St James

Notes

References

Sources
 
 

Kinnersley
Diocese of Hereford
Grade I listed churches in Herefordshire